Ričet (barley porridge boiled with beans) is a traditional Slovenian, Croatian, Austrian and Bavarian dish. It is a thick soup. It contains pot barley, beans, potatoes, carrots, parsley, celery, leeks, tomatoes, onions, and garlic. There is typically a substantial amount of cured pork in it.
In essence it is a starchy dish, similar to a risotto. By adding more water it can be easily turned into a heavy soup dish.

Etymology
In fact,  is a fairly greasy dish.

It has a historical reputation of being served to prisoners.

See also
 Slovenian cuisine
 Kongbap, the Korean grain and legume dish, also sometimes associated with prison food service

References

External links
 Ričet with photo

Slovenian cuisine
German cuisine
Austrian cuisine
Croatian cuisine